Helmut Griem (6 April 1932 – 19 November 2004) was a German film, television and stage actor, and director.

Biography
Born in Hamburg, Griem was primarily a stage actor, appearing at the Thalia Theater in Hamburg, the Deutsches Schauspielhaus in Hamburg, the Burgtheater in Vienna, the Munich Kammerspiele, and finally in the Staatstheater am Gärtnerplatz, also in Munich. 

Griem became well known to international audiences as the diabolic SS-officer Aschenbach in The Damned. His role in the Academy Award-winning film Cabaret (1972) as the wealthy bisexual Baron Maximilian von Heune is probably his best-known international performance.

Other performances include his work in  The McKenzie Break, and Ludwig and Breakthrough. Among his many film and TV appearances was one in NBC's Peter the Great as the Tsar's lifelong friend and "right hand" Alexander Menshikov, alongside Maximilian Schell.  He starred in the television mini-series The Devil's Lieutenant directed by John Goldschmidt, adapted by Jack Rosenthal and based on the novel by the Hungarian-American playwright and author Maria Fagyas (1905–1985), for Channel 4 and ZDF.

Griem performed in many classic roles from both the German and English-language repertoire. Later in his career Griem turned to theatre direction, including Long Day's Journey Into Night by Eugene O'Neill. Before his death, he had planned to direct the Botho Strauss play, Die eine und die andere (This One and The Other). Griem twice won the Bambi Award: in 1961 and in 1976. 

He died in Munich in 2004, aged 72.

Theatre

Filmography

References

External links
 
 Helmut Griem Fan Tribute
 Interview with Helmut Griem german
 

1932 births
2004 deaths
Burials at the Ohlsdorf Cemetery
German theatre directors
Male actors from Hamburg
Officers Crosses of the Order of Merit of the Federal Republic of Germany